Aleksandar "Saša" Antić (born 15 October 1973) is a Croatian rapper, singer-songwriter and producer. He is widely known for his work as the founding member, primary lyricist and vocalist for the cult Split-based rap group The Beat Fleet, but also recorded successfully as a solo artist.

Awards and nominations

Porin Awards

References

1973 births
Living people
Croatian rappers
21st-century Croatian male singers
Croatian tenors
Croatian male voice actors
Croatian record producers
Croatian hip hop musicians
Remixers
Indexi Award winners
Musicians from Split, Croatia